The Buccaneer 210 is an American trailerable sailboat that was designed by Alan Payne as a cruiser and first built in 1974.

The boat is a development of the Columbia T-23, using the same hull molds.

Production
The design was built by Bayliner Marine Corp. in the United States, starting in 1974, but it is now out of production.

Design
The Buccaneer 210 is a recreational keelboat, built predominantly of fiberglass, with wood trim. It has a masthead sloop rig, a raked stem, a plumb transom, a transom-hung rudder controlled by a tiller and a fixed, very shallow draft, long keel. It displaces , carries  of ballast and has positive foam flotation.

The boat is normally fitted with a small  outboard motor for docking and maneuvering.

The design has sleeping accommodation for six people, with a double "V"-berth in the bow cabin, a drop-down dinette table that converts into a double berth in the main cabin and an aft cabin with a double berth under the cockpit. The galley is located on the starboard side just forward of the companionway ladder. The galley is equipped with a two-burner stove and a sink. The head is located under the bow cabin berth.

Operational history
In a 1976 Cruising World review reported, "quite frankly, the Buccaneer 210 contradicts itself, At 21', it should be a small boat, but one look inside tells you it has to be much bigger. Stand-up headroom and full eight-foot beam enhance the spaciousness, and bright new fabrics and finishing add to the open feeling."

In a 2010 review Steve Henkel wrote, "in the 1970s, sailboat marketers perceived a public out-cry for more space below, more creature comforts, and more features which would appeal to women. Many yacht designers couldn't face the prospect of ruining the graceful appearance of their creations by raising the deck of a small sailboat beyond what looked good. But Bayliner Marine, used to designing powerboats which already
were boxy enough to have more or less the same silhouette as a wedding cake, had no such compunctions. Ignoring conventional aesthetic considerations, Bayliner came up with the high-topped but roomy design shown here. Best features: What? A 21-foot boat that sleeps six, has 5' 8" headroom, a dinette, and a full galley including a built-in icebox? Feast your eyes ... Worst features: All the design considerations that allow the "best features" listed above also mean a high, boxy look and excessive windage, that can cause poor upwind performance from sideways slippage (accentuated by a too-shallow fixed keel). The Buccaneer 210 also has a very low SA/D ratio and a high D/L ratio, both tending to make her slow in light air. And the cabin sole and sides of the hull are covered with plush pile carpeting. Ugh!"

See also
List of sailing boat types

Related development
Buccaneer 200
Buccaneer 220

References

Keelboats
1970s sailboat type designs
Sailing yachts
Trailer sailers
Sailboat type designs by Alan Payne
Sailboat types built by Buccaneer Yachts